John Talbot, 10th Earl of Shrewsbury, 10th Earl of Waterford (1601 – 8 February 1654), was an English nobleman.

Life
He was the only child and son of John Talbot of Longford, Newport, Shropshire (died London, 1607 or c. 1607), and his wife Eleanor Baskerville, daughter of Sir Thomas Baskerville of Wolvershill, Herefordshire, and of Brinsop, Herefordshire, and paternal grandson of Sir John Talbot of Grafton and Catherine or Katharine Petre.

He remained in his family's Roman Catholic faith and took part on the side of King Charles I in the English Civil War. He was First Commissioner of Advice for the counties of Worcestershire, Shropshire and Staffordshire in 1644/45, and he served on the Royalist garrison at Worcester when it surrendered to Parliament in July 1646.  In 1647 his estates were sequestered and compounded by Parliament on grounds of his being a "Papist and delinquent" (i.e. Catholic and royalist).

In September 1651 he accompanied Charles II when he fled after defeat at the battle of Worcester, escorting him to White Ladies Priory in Shropshire, where the king was hidden for a time. The Earl died in 1653/54 at Tasmore, Oxfordshire, and was succeeded by his second son.

Family
Talbot married Mary Fortescue, by whom he had seven children: 
 Lady Frances Talbot (d. 17 July 1641), who married George Winter, 1st Baronet (1622-1658), and had one child, Thomas Winter.
 George Talbot, Baron Talbot (circa 1620 - 7 March 1644), who married Mary, daughter of Percy Herbert, 2nd Baron Powis. He had one daughter, Mary, who was living in 1649 but died young and unmarried.
 Francis Talbot, 11th Earl of Shrewsbury (1623-1667), who succeeded
 Edward Talbot, who died at the Battle of Marston Moor, 1644
 Hon. Gilbert Talbot (bef. 1654-1711), who married Jane Flatsbury and had children, including Gilbert Talbot, 13th Earl of Shrewsbury
 Lady Catherine, who married Thomas Whetenhall of East Peckham
 Lady Mary Talbot (bef. 1654 - c. March 1711), who married first Charles Arundell and second Mervyn Tuchet, 4th Earl of Castlehaven; she had children from both marriages.

He later married Hon. Frances Arundell, 4th daughter of Thomas Arundell, 1st Baron Arundell of Wardour and had three sons and a daughter by her: 
 Hon. John Talbot, who died young
 Hon. Bruno Talbot, Chancellor of the Exchequer of Ireland, 1686
 Hon. Thomas Talbot
 Lady Anne, who became a nun in France

References

1601 births
1654 deaths
John
Earls of Shrewsbury
Earls of Waterford